Edward M. McGuire was a Scottish professional footballer who played in the Scottish League for Heart of Midlothian as an inside right.

Personal life 
McGuire served as a private in the Royal Scots during the First World War. He was wounded in the arm by flying shrapnel on the first day on the Somme and as he fell, a machine gun bullet grazed his head. McGuire was later invalided out of the army.

Career statistics

References 

Scottish footballers
Scottish Football League players
British Army personnel of World War I
Heart of Midlothian F.C. players
Royal Scots soldiers
Association football inside forwards
1893 births
Year of death missing